Ada Apa Dengan Cinta? is a 2002 Indonesian romantic drama film directed by Rudy Soedjarwo. The Indonesian title is a play on words, as Cinta (Indonesian for "love") is also the name of the main character. As such, the title can be translated as "What's Up with Love?" as well as "What's Up with Cinta?", meaning the person. The film is coloured with Indonesian mainstream as well as sidestream values, elements of classical culture and politics, and real issues encountered in teen life. The film raised censorship controversies among conservative Muslims in Indonesia, being the first Indonesian teen movie that featured a scene of a passionate kiss. The movie is known as Beautiful Days in Japan. Shortly after its success, What's Up with Cinta? was adapted into a sinetron (soap opera) version.

In 2014, Japanese chatting software LINE released a promotional short film featuring the cast of What's Up with Love? titled Ada Apa dengan Cinta? 2014 that portrays Rangga contacting Cinta via LINE after 12 years. The short's success led to a full-length feature film sequel, Ada Apa Dengan Cinta? 2 in 2016 that serves as an official follow up to this movie, ignoring the events from the short film. The sequel was met with much success.

Plot 
Cinta is a popular teenage girl living a comfortable lifestyle. She is gifted and accomplished, surrounded by a group of faithful friends consisting of the wise Alya, the tomboyish Karmen, the sassy Maura, and the ditzy Milly. She also has caring and supportive parents. The friends cry on each others' shoulders for Alya, who is the victim of domestic abuse by her father. Cinta recites the group's pledge to the buku curhat, a diary/scrapbook shared by the girls, that a problem one of them is going through is to be shared with all of them.

Cinta is a school poet who has been honored for her work, and, in her final year of high school, she submits a poem to the yearly poetry contest. However, much to the students' surprise, Cinta does not win - the grand prize in the contest is awarded to a boy named Rangga, whose name is not well known in the school. Rangga, rather than going to the podium to receive his prize, takes offence and retreats to a hiding spot. Cinta is somewhat jealous of Rangga's unexpected victory, but is careful not to show it. This leads Cinta to search for Rangga and request an interview for the school bulletin. However, Rangga immediately detects insincerity in Cinta's congratulations and walks away, leaving Cinta to be irritated by his perceived arrogance. As it turns out, Rangga never entered his poem for the contest; it was submitted on his behalf by his only best friend, the school janitor Mr. Wardiman.

Cinta and Rangga start to dislike each other, and so do her friends. They briefly warm up to each other after Rangga thanks Cinta for returning his book. It doesn't last long since Rangga offends Cinta in a bookstore. When Rangga tries to apologize to Cinta the next day, he is beaten up by Borné, a guy who had been trying to start a relationship with Cinta. Rangga and Cinta start to become friends when Cinta visits Rangga in his house, where she discovers that Rangga lives in a lower-middle-class neighbourhood with his father Yusrizal, whose outspokenness has led to bomb threats from pro-government thugs. Moreover, his parents divorced because of his father's dismissal from a government office for exposing government corruption. Alya, who regularly tells Cinta her broken home problems, is the only one Cinta tells of her budding closeness with Rangga.

The secret friendship causes changes in Cinta's behaviour, resulting in problems with Cinta's group of girlfriends. She starts to regularly lie to her friends in order to spend more time with Rangga. The problem reaches its climax when Cinta ignores Alya's desperate request to talk with her because she is going on a date with Rangga. When she comes home, she is told that Alya is in the hospital because she attempted suicide. At the hospital, the friends realize that Cinta has been lying all along, straining their friendship. Thinking it was all her fault, Cinta then shuts Rangga out, hurting him. When Alya recovers, she discusses Rangga with Cinta, which Karmen, Maura, and Milly overhear and finally discover the formerly budding relationship between Cinta and Rangga. Cinta apologizes to them and Maura advises her to forget Rangga.

Cinta does so, and goes on with her life. Meanwhile, Karmen sees Rangga give Mr. Wardiman a goodbye hug. Noticing that Cinta has turned quiet and uncommunicative, her friends realize the error of their ways and Cinta confesses that she is in love with Rangga, but is not ready to admit it. Karmen tells her she doesn't have much time since she saw Rangga leave. Mr. Wardiman tells the girls that Rangga is heading to the airport. In a rush, they force their nerdy schoolmate Mamet to lend his car so they can go to the airport. Cinta manages to catch Rangga, as he and his father are moving to New York City. They profess their love for each other and share a kiss, but Rangga has to go, leaving Cinta heartbroken. Before departing, Rangga gives Cinta a book and tells her to read the last page. They bid each other one last farewell, and he boards the plane.

In the car, Cinta reads the last page, which contains a poem Rangga wrote about her. The last line says that he will return before the full moon. Suddenly, the girls freak out when they realize they have left Mamet at the airport.

Cast 
 Dian Sastrowardoyo as Cinta
 Nicholas Saputra as Rangga
 Ladya Cheryl as Alya
 Titi Kamal as Maura
 Sissy Priscillia as Milly
 Adinia Wirasti as Karmen
 Dennis Adhiswara as Mamet
 Febian Ricardo as Borné
 Mang Diman as Mr. Wardiman
 Gito Rollies as Limbong

Music 

Ada Apa dengan Cinta? is the soundtrack to the 2002 film of the same name by musician Melly Goeslaw and Anto Hoed under Aquarius Musikindo label. It was released on 8 January 2002, while the film released on 8 February. The soundtrack features 12 original songs with music by Hoed (except for "Dimana Malumu"—arranged by Yudis, and "Ingin Mencintai dan Dicintai"—arranged by Aksan Sjuman) and lyrics by Goeslaw. It features the critically acclaimed song "Ada Apa dengan Cinta?"—which won the AMI Award for Best Song, Clear Top 10 Award for Coolest Song and Viewer Favorite Song.

All tracks are written by Melly Goeslaw. All songs arranged by Anto Hoed except were noted.

Accolades 

 2004 Indonesian Film Festival
 Best Actress in a Leading Role (Dian Sastrowardoyo)
 Best Director (Rudi Soedjarwo)
 Best Original Score (Melly Goeslaw & Anto Hoed)
 Best Screenplay (Jujur Prananto, Rako Prijanto, Riri Riza)

In popular culture
A parody of a could-be scene in the movie, personally played by Saputra and Sastrowardoyo, was made into a commercial for a popular mall in Jakarta called Plaza Senayan.

See also 
 Ada Apa Dengan Cinta? 2
 Milly & Mamet

References

External links 
 

2002 films
2000s Indonesian-language films
Films shot in Indonesia
2002 romantic drama films
2000s teen romance films
2000s teen drama films
Indonesian romantic drama films
Indonesian teen romance films
Indonesian teen drama films
Films scored by Melly Goeslaw
Films scored by Anto Hoed
Films directed by Rudy Soedjarwo